National Cadet Corps may refer to:

Bangladesh National Cadet Corps 
National Cadet Corps (Ghana) 
National Cadet Corps (India) 
National Cadet Corps (Pakistan)
National Cadet Corps (Singapore) 
National Cadet Corps (Sri Lanka)